Mussurana montana is a species of snake in the family Colubridae. The species is native to Brazil.

References

Mussuranas
Mussurana (genus)
Snakes of South America
Reptiles described in 1997
Endemic fauna of Brazil
Reptiles of Brazil